Azam Hussain (born 7 September 1985) is a Pakistani first-class cricketer who plays for Port Qasim Authority.

References

External links
 

1985 births
Living people
Pakistani cricketers
Port Qasim Authority cricketers
Cricketers from Karachi
Karachi Dolphins cricketers
Defence Housing Authority cricketers